The 2013 Rolex Sports Car Series season was the fourteenth and final season of the Grand American Road Racing Association's premier series, before merging up with the American Le Mans Series in 2014. It began on January 26, with the 51st running of the 24 Hours of Daytona.

As the NASCAR Holdings acquisition of Panoz Motor Sports, and IMSA, had already taken place, this season is technically one of two series that formed the 43rd season of the IMSA GT Championship that dates to 1971.

Schedule

The schedule was released on September 28, 2012 and featured the addition of three new circuits for the series; Circuit of the Americas, Kansas Speedway, and Road Atlanta. Also, the August 10 event at Road America was a combined weekend with the American Le Mans Series, showcasing the organizations' recent merger. Previous races at Homestead-Miami Speedway, New Jersey Motorsports Park, Watkins Glen Short Course and Circuit Gilles Villeneuve did not return.

News
Lotus announced that they are developing a new Evora for the 2013 Rolex season.
The series introduced a new alternative fueled "GX" class for the 2013 season. The vehicles also utilized new technologies not otherwise used in the series. Mazda announced that it would offer its SkyActiv-D diesel engine to teams for this new class. 2013 also marked the first season since 2004 to feature three classes.
In September 2012, Grand Am tested Kansas Speedway in hopes of adding it to the 2013 schedule. The tests proved successful.

Results
Overall winners in bold.

Championship standings
Championship points are awarded based on finishing positions as shown below. The exception is at the 24 Hours of Daytona, where a minimum of 15th place points are awarded so as not to excessively penalize a low finish when there are generally more entrants.

Daytona Prototypes

Drivers (Top 20)

Notes
 Drivers denoted by † did not complete sufficient laps in order to score points.

Chassis

Engine

Grand Touring

Drivers (Top 20)

Notes
 Drivers denoted by † did not complete sufficient laps in order to score points.

Engine

GX Class

Drivers

Notes
 Drivers denoted by † did not complete sufficient laps in order to score points.

Engine

References

Rolex Sports Car Series
Rolex Sports Car Series